Taloyoak or Talurjuaq (Inuktitut syllabics: ᑕᓗᕐᔪᐊᖅ ), formerly known as Spence Bay until 1 July 1992, although the body of water on which it is situated continues to be known as Spence Bay — same as the body of water on which Iqaluit is situated continues to be known as Frobisher Bay — (2021 population 934) is located on the Boothia Peninsula, in the Kitikmeot Region of Nunavut, Canada. The community is served only by air and by annual supply sealift. Taloyoak, the northernmost community in mainland Canada, in Inuktitut means  "large blind", referring to a stone caribou blind or a screen used for caribou hunting.

Demographics

Languages spoken are English and Inuktitut.

Broadband communications 
The community has been served by the Qiniq network since 2005. Qiniq is a fixed wireless service to homes and businesses, connecting to the outside world via a satellite backbone. The Qiniq network is designed and operated by SSi Canada. In 2017, the network was upgraded to 4G LTE technology, and 2G-GSM for mobile voice.

Surrounding area
Taloyoak is surrounded by tundra and the ground is black/grey. To the north there is an impressive rock formation that looks similar to Uluru. Farther north is the Murchison Promontory, the northernmost mainland point of the Americas and of Canada.

Climate 
Taloyoak  has a tundra climate (“ET”), a polar climate sub-type under the Köppen climate classification,  with short but cool summers and long cold winters.

See also

List of municipalities in Nunavut
 Bill Lyall
 Marten Hartwell
 David Pisurayak Kootook
 Netsilik
 Netsilik School
 Taloyoak Airport

References

Further reading

 Canadian Permanent Committee on Geographical Names. Taloyoak, Northwest Territories. Ottawa, Ont: CPCGN Secretariat, 1992.
 Gray, Dorothy Allen. Looking Down, Up North with Arctic Specialty Foods from Spence Bay, the Northwest Territories, Canada Recipes. S.l: s.n.], 1974.
 Harris, Pamela. Another Way of Being Photographs of Spence Bay N.W.T. Toronto: Impressions, 1976.
 Williamson, Robert G. The Boothia Peninsula People Social Organization in Spence Bay, N.W.T. Polar Gas socio-economic program. Saskatoon: University of Saskatchewan. Institute for Northern Studies, 1977.

External links

Taloyoak, Nunavut

Populated places in Arctic Canada
Hamlets in the Kitikmeot Region
Road-inaccessible communities of Nunavut